Onychostoma fusiforme is a species of cyprinid in the genus Onychostoma. It is used for food locally.

References

fusiforme
Cyprinid fish of Asia
Fish described in 1998